Joseph Silver Hyder (died 1932) was secretary to the Land Nationalisation Society in Britain.

Alfred Russel Wallace wrote an introduction to Hyder's work The Case for Land Nationalisation (1914, London: Simpkin, Marshall, Hamilton, Kent and co.), and Hyder was one of the small gathering who attended Wallace's funeral in 1913.

Hyder stood as a Progressive Party candidate at Strand in the 1904 London County Council election.

Publications 
Land Problems
Public Property in Land
State Land Purchase without Loan or Tax
The Curse of Landlordism
The Case for Land Nationalisation

References

Year of birth missing
1932 deaths
British activists
Progressive Party (London) politicians
Land management